Statistics of Qatar Stars League for the 2006–07 season.

Overview
It was contested by 10 teams, and Al-Sadd Sports Club won the championship.

League standings

Top goalscorers
Source: goalzz.com

19 goals
 Younis Mahmoud (Al-Gharafa)

18 goals
 Emerson Sheik (Al-Sadd)

16 goals
 João Tomás (Al=Arabi), (Al-Rayyan)

12 goals
 Ismail Al-Ajmi (Al-Shamal)

11 goals
 Rodrigo Gral (Al-Khor)
 Amad Al-Hosni (Qatar SC)
 Mirghani Al-Zain (Al-Wakrah)
 A'ala Hubail (Al-Gharafa)

10 goals
 Sabri Lamouchi (Al-Rayyan)
 Bouchaib El Moubarki (Al-Arabi)
 Husain Ali (Umm-Salal)

References
Qatar - List of final tables (RSSSF)

Qatar
1